The Louisiade monarch (Symposiachrus melanopterus) is a species of bird in the family Monarchidae endemic to Papua New Guinea. It is found in the Louisiade Archipelago. Its natural habitats are subtropical or tropical moist lowland forest and subtropical or tropical moist shrubland. It is threatened by habitat loss.

Taxonomy and systematics
This species was originally described as a species by George Robert Gray as Monarcha melanoptera, later as a subspecies of the spectacled monarch.

References

 Gill F, D Donsker & P Rasmussen  (Eds). 2022. IOC World Bird List (v12.1). doi :  10.14344/IOC.ML.12.1

Louisiade monarch
Louisiade monarch
Taxa named by George Robert Gray